The men's mass start at the 2017 KNSB Dutch Single Distance Championships in Heerenveen took place at Thialf ice rink on Friday 30 December 2016. There were 30 participants.

Result 

Source:
Source:

References

Single Distance Championships
2017 Single Distance